#ByeFelicia is the first mixtape by American R&B-pop singer Jordin Sparks. The mixtape was announced in early November 2014. #ByeFelicia is the first release of a body of work since her second album, Battlefield in 2009. The mixtape was released on November 25, 2014 as a precursor for Sparks' third album Right Here Right Now (2015), and featured snippets of new songs, including some that would feature in full on Right Here Right Now.

Background
Since 2010, Sparks was rumored to be working on her third studio album set to be released by RCA Records. After experiencing multiple delays in the release, as well as two label changes, Sparks announced on November 24 that she would be releasing a mixtape on November 25. Prior to any official announcements, Sparks label exec, Salaam Remi hosted a music showcase featuring Sparks. Sparks showcased three songs, two of which were performed live. Sparks announced this would be the first time she would play new music for people outside of the industry.

Following the showcase, Sparks announced that the first single off her upcoming effort, would be released in a two-week time frame. Sparks announcement to Lance Bass brought speculation that the single would be released on November 18, 2014. The song "How Bout Now", a remix of the same song by Drake addresses the singer's former relationship with fellow American singer Jason Derulo.

At the end of the last track "11:11 (Wish)", Sparks announces that her third studio album Right Here Right Now will be released in early 2015.

Singles
"It Ain't You" was officially released independently of the mixtape. A new version of the song debuted on Sparks' Vevo channel on December 2, 2014. This version differed from the mixtape version production as well as the inclusion of some vocal additions. The song became available digital download December 16, 2014.

Track listing

References

Jordin Sparks albums
Albums produced by DJ Mustard
2014 mixtape albums